Firefighter rehabilitation is a vital firefighting service, providing firefighters and other emergency personnel with immediate medical attention including rehydration, treatment for smoke inhalation, and the prevention of life-threatening conditions such as heatstroke and heart attack after working at the scene of an incident. Firefighter rehabilitation can include a variety of things from a simple check up to deciding whether or not the firefighter needs to see a doctor. The rehabilitation area is set up in a safe location near the incident so that it can be accessible to any emergency responders who may need it.

Purpose 
Firefighter rehabilitation is designed to ensure that the physical and mental well-being of members operating at the scene of an emergency (or a training exercise) don't deteriorate to the point where it affects the safety of any other members. Firefighting is inherently dangerous in the best of circumstances, and any additional physical or mental stress increases the danger. In a 1993 US Coast Guard study of the effects of interior firefighting on the human body, researchers noted that the firefighter body core temperatures often reaches 104 degrees Fahrenheit during the firefight, even after short exposures.

The primary mission for fire command is to identify, examine, and evaluate the physical and mental status of fire-rescue personnel who have been working during the emergency incident or a training exercise. Following a proper survey, it should be determined what additional treatment, if any, may be required. According to the U.S. Federal Emergency Management Agency (FEMA), "Any activity/incident that is large in size, long in duration, and/or labor intensive will rapidly deplete the energy and strength of personnel and there merits consideration for rehabilitation."

Designating a Rehabilitation Area 
A specially designated Rehabilitation Area is established at the discretion of the Incident Commander in consult with the senior Fire Safety Officer. If the Incident Commander determines that Rehab is necessary, qualified Paramedics or EMTs (assigned to the first alarm response) should be designated to manage the Rehab Area under the command of a fire or EMS officer or supervisor. The site should be located away from any environmental hazards, or by-products of the fire, such as smoke, gases or fumes. During hot months, the ideal location might include a shady, cool area distant from the incident. In winter, a warm, dry area is preferred. Regardless of the season, the area should be readily accessible to EMS-Rescue personnel and their equipment, so they may restock the sector with supplies, or in the event that ambulance transport is required. Rehab sites can also be established in the lobbies of nearby buildings, a parking lot, or even inside municipal buses. During large-scale incidents, like multi-alarm fires, multiple Rehab Areas may be necessary. 
Rehabilitation equipment includes but is not limited to:
Canopy to provide shade
Misting fans for cooling
Cooling Vest for quicker metabolic heat removal
Chairs to provide temporary rest 
Coolers with water and other rehydrating beverages
Food

Coordination and Manning 
Command of the Rehab Area is assigned to a fire chief or company level officer, who is designated as the Rehab Officer under most Incident Command structures. A minimum of two trained EMS personnel should initially be assigned to monitor and assist firefighters in the Rehab Sector, but more personnel may be necessary for larger incidents. Volunteer canteen or auxiliary members often assist EMS personnel in making "working" members as comfortable as possible.  

It is important for command and company level officers to continually monitor personnel for telltale signs of exhaustion, stress, and or physical trauma. Individual members are encouraged to report to the Rehab Sector at any time that he or she feels the need to do so. Symptoms may include weakness, dizziness, chest pain, muscle cramps, nausea, altered mental status, difficulty breathing, and others. Additionally, in order to prevent the development of life-threatening conditions, all fireground personnel (regardless of physical well-being) should report to the Rehab Sector immediately following strenuous activity, the use and depletion of two SCBA bottles (or failure of an SCBA), or thirty (30) minutes of operation within a hazardous/dangerous environment.

Medical Monitoring 
When firefighters get to the rehabilitation tent, they are monitored to prevent life-threatening conditions such as heat stroke and heart attack. Medical monitoring includes:

 Vital signs, such as Respiratory Rate, Blood Pressure, Heart Rate
 Lung Sounds
 Blood Oxygen Levels 
 Skin condition and color, Pupils
Body core temperature
Administration of a 2-lead EKG, when chest pain or irregular heartbeat is presented
Scoring on the Glasgow Coma Scale.
Heart rate should be measured as early as possible in the rest period. If the firefighter's heart rate exceeds 110 beats per minute, it is recommended that an oral temperature be taken. If body core temperature exceeds 100.6F, the firefighter should not be permitted to wear protective equipment or re-enter the active work environment, until temperature has been reduced and heart rate decreased.

It is recommended that re-examination occur at ten-minute intervals. Using standing orders or existing protocol, Rehab Team Members should record examination results on medical evaluation forms as indicated by the local jurisdiction.

Personnel 
Some fire departments run their own fireground rehab, either by in house firefighters trained in the medical field or it may be provided by:
Private non-profit organizations, such as fire buffs  (not to be confused with firebugs or arsonists), sparkies  and other organizations
Emergency medical services (EMS)
 First Aid and Rescue Squads
Rehab services run by private individuals

Vehicles
Dedicated rehab vehicles
Converted ambulances
Converted step vans (types of step vans)
Converted canteen trucks
Converted buses.
Pickup trucks

See also
 Firefighting
 Glossary of firefighting terms
 Turnout Gear
 Emergency
 Chest Pain
 Emergency Medical Services
 Fire Buff
 Medical Attention
 Rehydration
 Smoke Inhalation
 Heat Stroke
 Heart Attack

References

External links
 The Salvation Army Emergency Disaster Services
 Rehab 5
 Box 15 Club
 Box 4 Special Services
 Milwaukee Fire Bell Club

Publications 
 USFA Emergency Incident Rehab Manual, FA-114
 FireRehab.com
 NFPA 1584 Standard on the Rehabilitation Process for Members During Emergency Operations and Training Exercises
 NIOSH Publication No. 2007-133: Preventing Fire Fighter Fatalities Due to Heart Attacks and Other Sudden Cardiovascular Events
 
Emergency services
Firefighting